Roy Harper is a superhero appearing in American comic books published by DC Comics. Roy is one of DC's most longstanding characters, originating in 1940s comics as Speedy, the teen sidekick of the superhero Green Arrow. Like his mentor Green Arrow, Roy is a world-class archer and athlete who uses his exceptional marksmanship to fight crime. Along with other prominent DC Comics superhero sidekicks, he goes on to become a core member of the superhero group the Teen Titans. As an adult, Roy casts off his Speedy identity to establish himself as the superhero Arsenal, and later takes on the name Red Arrow to symbolise his coming-of-age and having become an equal of Green Arrow as he joins the Justice League. In addition to continuing to serve on occasion as one of the Titans, Roy has had leading roles in the superhero groups the Seven Soldiers of Victory, the Outsiders, Checkmate, the Justice League, and the Outlaws.

He was the subject of the award-winning 1971 comic book story "Snowbirds Don't Fly", which was celebrated for its gritty depiction of Roy's battle with drug addiction; the story is considered a key moment in comic book history as it represented the emergence of mature themes in comics. In 2013, ComicsAlliance ranked Harper as #50 on their list of the "50 Sexiest Male Characters in Comics". The character has been adapted for video games and animation several times, and was portrayed in live action by actor Colton Haynes on the Arrowverse television series Arrow.

Publication history 

The character first appeared as Green Arrow's teenage sidekick Speedy, a name by which he was known for over fifty years, in More Fun Comics #73 (November 1941) and was created by Mort Weisinger and George Papp. The character's modern-day version was an early member of the Teen Titans who later assumed the identity Arsenal in The New Titans #99 (July 1993), and became a member of the Justice League of America under the guise Red Arrow in Kingdom Come #2 (June 1996) or Justice League of America vol. 2 #7 (May 2007).

Fictional character biography

1941–1992: Origin, Teen Titans, addiction and fatherhood

As an infant, Roy was raised by his father, Roy Harper Sr., a forest ranger. The fate of his birth mother is unknown, something that Roy has questioned his entire life, not sure whether she left them or died. When his father died in a forest fire when Roy was a baby, he was rescued by a man named Brave Bow, a Navajo medicine chief. Brave Bow took Roy into his tribe and raised him as his own son, telling him about how his birth father saved him, which made Roy grow up seeing him as a hero. Under Brave Bow's tutelage, Roy trained in archery, becoming remarkable at a very young age and a champion in several events. Roy began learning about the superhero Green Arrow (Oliver Queen) and started idolizing him, seeing him as a hero alongside his father and Brave Bow.

When Brave Bow learned of an illness that would lead to his death, he contacted Green Arrow, asking him to take Roy in and raise him after his death. After posing as a judge in an archery contest, Green Arrow was impressed by Roy's skills as an archer, which prompted to him test Roy's character by rigging his arrows with magnets so they can be deflected, where Roy proceeded to impress Green Arrow as well. After Brave Bow's death, Roy was adopted by Green Arrow and became his sidekick, Speedy. He was given the name Speedy after he stopped a pair of robbers faster than Green Arrow could even put on his costume, and for being quicker than at shooting arrows and in general.

Speedy became a founding member of the Teen Titans along with Robin, Kid Flash, Aqualad and Wonder Girl, a group they formed so they as sidekicks could come out of their mentors' shadows and become their own. Roy developed a crush on Donna, and the two eventually began dating.

As Roy spent more and more time with the Teen Titans, Oliver left to travel the country with Green Lantern (Hal Jordan) after Oliver had lost his fortune. When the Teen Titans had their first break up, Roy found himself alone. Trying to find some comfort, he started taking drugs and developed a heroin addiction in the award-winning "Snowbirds Don't Fly" story. When Oliver returned and learned of Roy's addiction and behavior, he reacted angrily and banished Roy from his house. When Hal found Roy on the street later, Roy vowed to fight and end his drug addiction. Hal took him to Black Canary, Oliver's girlfriend, who helped Roy with his drug withdrawal and gave him care. Roy reconciled with Oliver, but he officially ended their partnership with him, going fully solo.

When the Teen Titans formed again, Roy rejoined the team. He created a band, Great Frog, with fellow Titan Mal Duncan. Roy also managed the Titans' base of operations under the nightclub Gabriel's Horn, where his band played frequently.

After he went solo, Roy started working with the US Drug Enforcement Administration (DEA), working as a counselor in various anti-drug programs as well as in helping taking down drug operations and drug lords. His work with the DEA led to him joining the Central Bureau of Intelligence (CBI), a fictional federal agency in the DC Universe, where he worked as an agent and spy. While on undercover assignment with the CBI in Japan, Roy was supposed to capture the assassin Cheshire, but they fell in love and had a relationship. His feelings for her made him turn a blind eye and let her go free.

About a year later, Roy met Cheshire again on a mission with the Titans, where he found out he fathered a daughter with her, Lian. Cheshire, however, only allowed Roy to see her once. Desperate to see Lian again on her first birthday, Roy sought the help of his best friend, Dick Grayson, now going by Nightwing. The two of them found Lian and fought off Cheshire, where Dick helped him find Lian and give her to him. It was here that Cheshire realized how much more dangerous her life as an assassin was, and she decided to give Roy full custody of Lian.

As he sought a calmer place to learn how to raise Lian, Roy left the CBI and briefly moved to Northern Ireland, where his birth ancestors came from. Despite his attempt to avoid his work as a superhero there, he found that he could not avoid it as he found himself in the middle of a mystery. He then moved to Los Angeles, where he took up work as a private detective, balancing that job with being Speedy and raising his daughter. It was during this time that Roy also fully reunited with Oliver after some time of not being on full speaking terms, where he was finally prepared to forgive him and accept him as a father.

1993–1996: Becoming Arsenal and leading the Titans

Roy decided to take up spy work again, and he was reassigned to Checkmate, under the command of Sarge Steel. While at Checkmate, Roy expanded his skills beyond just using a bow and arrow and became a weapons expert, as well as mastering Moo Gi Gong, the martial art of using any household or random item as a weapon. This was when he stopped being Speedy to focus on his work as Agent Harper full-time. At Checkmate, Roy became friends with a fellow agent, Martin Santos and his wife Erika and their family, who helped him with Lian in her early years.

Being a founding member and current reserve member of the Titans, Roy was sent by Checkmate to talk to Dick about the Titans, who had recently been under pressure from the government and the media due to the large amount of damage caused in the battle against the Wildebeests in the Titans Hunt storyline. Roy was asked to convince Dick into having the Titans cooperate with the government, he had also secretly heard that if the Titans did not cooperate, Congress would work on shutting down all superhero teams, so he tried to levy the situation as much as he could, but he knew it would not work out.

Roy suggested a compromise to Sarge Steel: that he would return to the Titans full-time and make sure everything was going smooth himself. Since he had not been Speedy for some time, Roy decided to take on a new mantle. With some help and technology acquired from Steve Dayton (whose mansion the Titans have been using as an HQ), Roy built new gear and a new costume, now officially calling himself Arsenal.

Some time later, the wedding of Dick and Starfire was interrupted by an attack, causing the death of the minister and damage all around. This caused a major uproar from the government and media against the Titans. Because of what happened at the wedding, Sarge Steel turned on the deal he made with Roy, demanding that he take leadership of the Titans himself, or else the government will shut them down. Roy refused to do it, not wanting to turn on Dick because he knew he had faith in him as a leader and man, confident that he would turn it around, but he kept receiving further pressure from Steel. The situation was only made worse when the attorney general announced he was planning on prosecuting the Titans and all non-sanctioned superhero teams. When he heard about that, Roy turned to Donna, Wally, Garth, and the rest of the Titans for advice on what he should do. Deciding that the situation was bad and had to be handled, they agreed to ask Dick to temporarily resign leadership until this thing blew over, especially since they agreed that he needed a break from all the pressure he'd been receiving himself recently after the wedding incident.

Roy, along with Donna, Garth, Red Star, and Pantha, went over to talk to Dick about it. After some arguing and a brief fight, Dick realized that he wasn't in any place to lead right now and agreed to hand over leadership, and take a leave of absence from the team as well, realizing that was what was best for him at the time because of everything that had happened recently. That was when Roy, with his new superhero identity as Arsenal, took over as leader of the Titans, much to his own dismay.

As leader, Roy was faced with constant pressure from the government. Eventually, with help from Wally and Garth, Roy managed to turn the situation on the government and take away anything they had on the Titans, making it so they operated on their own terms. As leader of the Titans, Roy brought on new members to the team including and established a satellite base in addition to the Earth base. Once he dealt with the government, Roy led the Titans on several cosmic missions. He planned to evolve the team beyond just traditional superhero business, wanting to expand the ways they could help. Eventually, he and Donna disbanded the team, when he realized it wasn't functioning as a family like the Titans should.

When Checkmate drugged Roy and unsuccessful tried manipulating him into killing someone, Roy severed all ties with them and Sarge Steel, going back to being a regular superhero.

1996–2003: Titans reunion

After the death of Oliver Queen, Roy moved to Metropolis. During a reunion with Dick, Wally, and Garth, Roy faced the villain Haze, who made Roy face an image of his ideal self, which was him in a red version of the Green Arrow suit. To honor Ollie after his recent death, Roy embraced this and took on the red Green Arrow suit fully and went back to using a bow as his primary weapon. He joined the new Teen Titans team, acting as an experienced mentor to the younger new heroes along with fellow first generation Titan Lilith Clay.

While in Metropolis, Roy and Lian were also sought out by Vandal Savage. Savage had discovered that both Roy and his daughter Lian were his descendants. Thus, their organs were suitable for him to harvest to prolong his life. Roy was able to save his daughter from Savage. Roy then got a band tattoo on his left bicep, to honor to his Navajo heritage.

Shortly after, Roy joined the rest of the original five Titans (now known as Nightwing, Arsenal, Troia, The Flash, and Tempest) in reforming the Titans team for a new generation. He resided in Titans Tower, with his daughter Lian. Roy took on a mentorship role to Grant Emerson, the younger hero known as Damage, who Roy recruited in his tenure as leader. He became a father figure to him, seeing a younger version of himself in Grant. It was also during this time that Roy found out he had a living relative in the form of Jim Harper, the clone of his great uncle.

2004–2006: Death of Donna Troy and reforming the Outsiders

A mysterious conglomerate known as Optitron offered to sponsor the Titans and Young Justice after summoning them to San Francisco. Before any decisions could be made, a cybernetic girl from the future known as Indigo invaded the complex, and immediately engaged both teams in combat. With half the group out of commission, the remaining members tried to track down Indigo, but instead encountered a rogue Superman android, which had been activated. Caught by surprise, Lilith had her neck snapped by the Superman android, killing her instantly. Donna Troy tried valiantly to defeat the Superman android, but he released a deadly heat beam directly through her chest, killing her. Roy, with help from Tim Drake, managed to reprogram Indigo, who arrived and shut down the Superman android, leaving Arsenal and Nightwing to mourn the fallen Troia. Shaken by these losses, Nightwing decided to officially end the Titans as he did not want to put the people he loved in the face of danger anymore, despite Roy's protests against this decision, saying they had to honor what the five of them started.

Mourning Donna's death, Roy shaved off his hair and donned a new, more advanced suit and got to work assembling a new team of heroes called the Outsiders, this time full of strangers instead of loved ones, in an effort to convince Dick to rethink his decision. Roy began by buying a massive secret underground headquarters beneath New York City. Roy outfitted the shelter with state-of-the-art equipment and began recruiting members for the new team.

Dick and Roy co-lead this new iteration of Outsiders that consisted of Thunder, Grace Choi, Shift, Jade, and Indigo, with the aim to try to take the lead on crime and take it down before it happens.

During a mission, Roy was shot five times in the chest, leaving him out of commission for three months. When he was ready to get back, despite his skills being just as good as they were before, he found it hard settle back in because of his PTSD and fear of his own limitations, finding that he was afraid of being shot again and what that might do to Lian if he were hurt in a worse way. With the help and encouragement of Nightwing, Roy found it in himself to believe in his abilities once more, and to get back out there and face his fears.

Not long after his recovery, the Outsiders took on a case which involved a child-slaver and molester named Tanner. One of Tanner's informants recognized Roy from years prior, and led Tanner to Lian. Lian's nanny was killed and the girl was branded with Tanner's mark. The Outsiders arrived just in time to save Lian and other children from being flown out of New York.

Roy's near-death experience from gunshot wounds saved his life when he faced Deathstroke. Since the Outsiders began, Roy had been collecting intel from Batman, but he found out that it was not actually Batman, it was Deathstroke posing as him. Deathstroke and Arsenal fought, with Deathstroke intending to kill him, but when the mercenary discovered the bullet scars on Arsenal's chest, he figured Arsenal had suffered enough and gave him a "pass", as a sign of respect for the history between the two with the Titans as well. About the same time, Arsenal was also kidnapped by Constantine Drakon, Green Arrow's nemesis. Drakon was working with the Riddler, and he slit Roy's throat so that he would have to apply constant pressure or die. The Outsiders helped search for and rescue Roy.

When Indigo was corrupted by Lex Luthor and exploded, killing herself in the process and almost killing the Outsiders and Teen Titans, Dick left the team, leaving Roy to assume full leadership of the team.

After the return of Donna Troy, Roy began to rethink his position as an Outsider. While leading an effort to take down the Secret Society, Roy realized that working like this was too much for him, and that operating from the shadows wasn't for him, and that he wasn't meant to blur the line. When Lian told him that she saw him up at night, looking sad, Roy finally made the decision to leave the Outsiders, accepting that he wasn't made for the life of a cloak-and-dagger type hero. He handed leadership of the team officially back to Dick and took his leave, seeking to be a hero more in the light, aspiring to be more of a hero that can be an inspiration to people and to Lian.

2005–2011: Becoming Red Arrow and joining the Justice League

For the next year, Roy worked solo for the most part. During a team up with Dinah Lance and Hal Jordan to help Red Tornado, Roy found himself fighting Amazo alongside several other heroes. After this, he was invited to join the Justice League, where he officially took on the name Red Arrow, wanting to honor his family name and legacy, seeing this name as a final coming-of-age for him to become the hero he was always meant to be.

While on the league, Roy developed a romantic relationship with Hawkgirl.

As Red Arrow, Roy found himself to be fully settled for the first time in a while, happy that he was fully embracing his legacy. He bought a house in Star City, to give Lian more room as she grew up, and even began giving her archery lessons, realizing that one day, she would probably want to take on the family legacy herself.

Roy was also part of the Titans as they reformed once again.

During a fight with Prometheus, Roy's right arm was severed, and he was left in coma. Prometheus unleashed an earthquake on Star City that resulted in the death of Lian as well. When Roy woke up, he was devastated, separating himself from everyone as he grew an addiction to pain medications, before falling into a new drug, which caused him to hallucinate ghosts. Roy also received a new cybernetic arm developed by his friend Cyborg. Dealing with his grief, Roy joined Cheshire in Deathstroke's new rogue Titans team, in a secret plan to take out Deathstroke from the inside. However, unbeknownst to him, Slade was drugging Roy to control him. When the drug wore off and Roy came back to his senses, he fought Deathstroke out and vowed to redeem himself in Lian's honor by redeeming the Titans name that Slade diminished, deeming it something worth fighting for, as well as making amends with everyone he loved. He decided to start and lead a new Titans team that would redeem the name, and he was joining the recently resurrected Jericho (Joey Wilson), his friend and fellow Titan.

During the Convergence storyline, Roy is living in Gotham, where he started a children's home and shelter, Lian's Place. The villain Dreamslayer offered Roy a deal: that he would return Lian if Roy betrayed his friends Donna Troy and Starfire. Roy outsmarted him and managed to get Lian back without harming anyone, revealing that he had weaponized Gotham in case something like this ever happened. With that, Lian was back to life and Roy was reunited with his daughter once more.

2011–2016: The New 52

As part of DC's New 52 reboot, Roy's story has changed quite a bit. Instead of his mother being unknown, she was a forest ranger along with his father, and they both died in the forest fire. Brave Bow was renamed Big Bow. Roy was raised in a Spokane tribe in Seattle instead of with the Navajo in Arizona. Roy also has an adoptive brother, Bird. When Big Bow was mysteriously killed, Roy believed that he accidentally killed him himself, and Roy couldn't deny it as his memories were unclear because of being intoxicated. However, years later, he would discover that Big Bow was killed by a corrupt sheriff, whom Roy brought to justice along with Oliver Queen. Roy's relationship with Oliver is slightly different. While the story of their separation remains much the same, their reunion took years to happen rather than the shorter time of the previous continuity. In the New 52, he was part of the Outlaws, where he developed a romantic relationship with Starfire. Roy's addiction was also briefly retconned into being an alcohol addiction, but was retconned back into a heroin addiction.

During the Titans Hunt storyline, Roy, along with several other heroes, found out he was part of the original Teen Titans, with all of their memories being forgotten due to unknown circumstances. When they discovered their memories were erased as a way to defeat the villain Mr. Twister, they defeated him once more in the present. This led to the team being reformed, with the team regaining their memories of each other's relationships. Roy's romance with Donna Troy was rekindled during this time, as the two remembered the years they spent together.

2016–2020: DC Rebirth
As part of DC Rebirth, Roy appeared as a main character in the Titans book, where he and the rest of the Titans were reunited with their best friend Wally West after he reappeared in the timeline. When Lilith encountered an anomaly in the multiverse, the Titans moved to Manhattan to investigate, where they set up Titans Tower once. The Titans took on various villains such as Abra Kadabra and the Fearsome Five, and Roy led them to take out a drug operation for a new drug known as Bliss.

Roy also redeveloped his romantic relationship with Donna Troy here, with the two admitting their shared feelings to one another.

Roy also fully reunited with Oliver in the Green Arrow title, where the two helped the protestors at Roy's tribe fight against a militia known as the Wild Dogs.

During the "Heroes in Crisis" storyline, Roy, alongside Wally West and various other heroes, was found deceased in the superhero rehabilitation facility known as Sanctuary. It was later revealed that Roy was accidentally killed by Wally West in a Speed Force explosion due to a Sanctuary malfunction. It was later confirmed to be Savitar that cause the explosion.

Arsenal is one of the many deceased heroes and villains resurrected as a zombie by Batman with a Black Lantern ring in Dark Nights: Death Metal. He takes part in the final battle against the forces of The Batman Who Laughs, killing a murderous alternate version of Wally with an arrow through the head. He tells the real Wally that he does not blame him for the Sanctuary disaster and the two fight side by side, jokingly referring to each other by their original aliases of "Kid Flash" and "Speedy".

2021–present: Infinite Frontier
Roy was restored to life by the reboot of the multiverse after Death Metal, but has so far chosen not to reveal himself. Deciding not to call Green Arrow or any of his friends, he discarded his cellphone, trademark trucker cap and bow at an isolated gas station and began hitchhiking down the highway.

Although Roy is believed dead by the general public and the superhero community, his resurrection is known to the Department of Extranormal Operations. He is the subject of one of several reports prepared by Cameron Chase for Director Bones. The report establishes that some aspects of Roy's pre-Flashpoint history have been restored to continuity, most notably the birth and apparent death of Lian Harper. Chase speculates about how Roy is handling his restored traumatic memories and whether he can be an asset or hindrance to the DEO.

At a bar in New Mexico, Roy deliberately antagonizes a man named Bill into a "fight". Roy allows Bill to repeatedly beat him and refuses to fight back, it is implied that he is once again attempting suicide. The bartender, who resembles Lian, steps in to defend him and Bill threatens her. Newly energized by his desire to protect her, Roy easily defeats Bill and steals his motorcycle, riding off into the night.

It is revealed in DC Festival of Heroes: The Asian Superhero Celebration that teenage vigilante and Catwoman supporting character Cheshire Cat, aka Shoes, is Lian Harper, alive and apparently suffering from amnesia.

Powers and abilities
In the comic books, Roy Harper possesses no superhuman attributes, but he is extremely adept at the use of the bow and arrow, as well as a wide array of weaponry, with Green Arrow admitting that Roy surpassed him. He also has the ability to take virtually any object and use it in combat as an effective weapon, a martial art he mastered known as Moo Gi Gong, which itself is a branch of Hwa Rang Do. Roy's Moo Gi Gong training included the mastery of 108 different classical weapon classes, which makes him a master weapon wielder with any weapon type (including, but not limited to, knives, swords, ropes, sais, blades, and staffs) and able to turn any random object into a deadly weapon. In addition, Roy's natural marksmanship and archery training from growing up gives him an impeccable aim that gives him perfect aim with any long range or projectile weapons. Harper is also a skilled hand-to-hand combatant and he possesses keen analytical and detective skills. He was trained in hand-to-hand fighting by several characters, including Black Canary and Nightwing. He was also taught how to box by Hal Jordan. Roy is a master of espionage because of his spy days at the CBI and Checkmate. Roy can also use acupressure as a means of temporarily disabling an opponent's muscles by hitting them at very specific points in their bodies, something that comes in handy with his precise aim. 

Roy speaks Japanese and understands Russian. Before Flashpoint, after the loss of his right arm, Roy Harper received an advanced prosthetic, built by Vic Stone, designed to loop around his damaged nerve endings and restore his usual degree of hand-to-eye coordination, albeit with the price of a constant phantom limb pain. The pain was eliminated in the second version of the arm.

Weapons and equipment
Before Flashpoint, much like Nightwing and other members of the Bat-Family, Roy Harper's suit is capable of emitting an electronic pulse. It is unknown, however, whether or not his suit is capable of emitting only one pulse, like Batman's and Nightwing's, or several. Roy carries various weapons in his many suits, including a bow and several arrows, including many utility and trick arrows. He has been known to carry around a crossbow, throwing knives, a staff, laser heat sidearms, billy clubs, a boomerang, an electrified bolas amongst a wide array of non-lethal weapons.

Roy also embeds Promethium Kevlar to armor his suits, which has saved his life on at least two occasions.

Personal life
Roy Harper is of Navajo heritage, and has a tribal band tattoo on his left bicep to represent it. He has had three father figures in his life: his biological father, Roy Harper Sr., who Roy sees as a hero after his death saving people in a forest fire, his adoptive father Brave Bow, who took Roy in and raised him like a son, and his second adoptive father, Oliver Queen (Green Arrow), who took Roy in after Brave Bow's death and made his ward and sidekick. Before becoming Speedy, Roy was a champion athlete, most notably in archery, but also in track and field.

Roy has a daughter named Lian whom he raised as a single father for years. Roy is a natural thrill seeker, who has many connections in the government and metahuman community. He has had several jobs, including being a drummer in his own band, running a nightclub, being a Private Detective, working as an agent and spy for the CBI, counseling in various anti-drug programs, and running a shelter for lost families.

Roy also sees Black Canary as a mother, since she took him in and helped him get through his withdrawal, and she was also one of his teachers in his training as a hero. He was there for her when she lost her own mother, and he has always had a close relationship with her.

Additionally, he sees Hal Jordan as an uncle figure, as he was always around when Roy was younger, being the best friend of Oliver. Roy cites that Hal was the one who taught Roy to be unafraid, and Hal has said that he sees himself in Roy, and could see him as his successor one day. Roy has also stated he sees Connor Hawke as a brother, with the two of them being Oliver's children, and growing to see each other as brothers despite the differences in how they turned out, but finding something in common in the fact that they both want to honor Oliver and Green Arrow's legacy. Roy also has a sibling relationship with the second Speedy, Mia Dearden. While he was against her being Speedy at first, he quickly changed his mind when he realized what it meant to her when she told him she wanted to take it on to honor him and his use of the Speedy mantle to fight through his addiction and change his life for the better by growing as a person and hero through putting a positive output to the world, and how that inspired her to take it up after her recent positive HIV diagnosis. Roy began taking on a bit of the mentor relationship to Mia, and handed down a various array of some of his old arrows and things he used as Speedy.

Roy also participates in a lot of volunteer work. In addition to counseling for anti-drugs and running a shelter for lost families, he also regularly volunteers at soup kitchens, especially around the holidays, and competes in various archery charity events in his superhero identities to raise money for charities.

Roy's most well known relationship throughout his history with the assassin Cheshire. After falling in love with her on a mission where he was sent to capture her, she became the mother of his child, a daughter called Lian. Roy and Jade had a relationship that was rekindled several times throughout the years, with both of them wanting to be there for their daughter and their love for each other, despite constantly being pulled away due to their different loyalties. Roy makes an effort to keep Jade part of Lian's life, despite her crimes and always being on the run. His feelings for Jade always made him see past her crimes, and he's even considered abandoning everything and running away with her and Lian.

Roy's first known superhero relationship was with Donna Troy during the Teen Titans. Although short-lived, the pair had rekindled their relationship on multiple occasions over the years, particularly during their time with the reformed Titans. When he formed the Outsiders, he had a fling with Grace Choi, although they mutually saw each other as friends-with-benefits. At this time, he also had a fling with the Huntress. During his time as a member of the Justice League, he was attracted to his JLA teammate Hawkgirl and they would later began a romantic relationship, but was eventually strained because of Hawkgirl's past relationship with Hawkman which caused Roy to feel she didn't take their relationship as seriously as he did.

Other versions

Earth-Two
The Earth-Two version of Speedy was a member of the Seven Soldiers of Victory and All-Star Squadron in the 1940s along with Green Arrow. Aside from their origin, having been trained on a mesa top together, their history nearly parallels the history of the Earth-One versions up until the point when Arrow and Speedy along with their teammates were thrown into various periods of time during a battle with the Nebula Man. He and his teammates were later retrieved by the Justice Society and the Justice League to assist them in saving Earth-Two from the machinations of their old foe the Iron Hand. Speedy had been sent to the Island of Circe in the past and turned into a centaur controlled by Circe, but was restored. During the Crisis on Infinite Earths a new solitary universe was created at the dawn of time, a universe whose history fused together the histories of several universes, including Earth-Two. Whether he ceased to exist or exists only as an aspect of the post-Crisis Earth has not been determined, although his mentor died during the final part of the Crisis defending the new Earth from the Anti-Monitor. Both this version of Speedy and Green Arrow were wiped from existence in Crisis on Infinite Earths.

Bizarro World
A Bizarro version of Arsenal appears as one of the heroes of Bizarro World. In addition to sporting a robotic left arm (as opposed to his right one), the Bizarro Arsenal is shown wearing a quiver filled with dead cats, which he uses as weapons.

Flashpoint
In the alternate timeline of the Flashpoint event, Roy Harper is a member of mercenary squad working for industrialist Oliver Queen. Very early in the story, however, Roy and his fellow mercenaries were killed by an unshown explosion set off by Vixen and a group of anti-Queen activists. The explosion actually kills everyone in the facility save for Vixen and Oliver Queen, who is remarkably unscathed even though he had been standing right next to Roy, discussing the possibility of becoming a group of actual heroes rather than mercenaries, at the time the explosion went off.

Titans Tomorrow
In the Titans Tomorrow future Roy Harper took on the role of Green Arrow and was killed in battle. It is hinted that his rivalry with Deathstroke developed fiercely over the years.

Thrillkiller
The Elseworlds story Batman: Thrillkiller features Roy as a supporting character. Set in the 1960's, Roy Harper is depicted as a biker who buys drugs to get friendly with schoolgirl Hayley Fitzpatrick (aka Harley Quinn), but a terrifying ordeal with drug runners leads him to alert the police after being helped by Batman and Black Canary. He is later shown practicing archery, though it is not clear if it is part of a rehab scheme or training for vigilantism.

Convergence
During the Convergence event, the New Earth version of Roy Harper is shown following the events of the Titans series. Still struggling with Lian's death, he has now devoted himself to helping the community to make amends for his time with Deathstroke. When the Extremists attack the city, he dons his Arsenal costume and helps his former teammates from the Teen Titans fight off the villains. Dreamslayer then uses his powers to pull Lian out of the timestream shortly before her death, and offers to return her to Roy in exchange for him turning on the Titans. Using trickery, Roy pretends to betray his friends, but instead scrambles Dreamslayer's teleportation field. As the Extremists retreat, Roy stays behind with Lian, finally reunited with his daughter.

In other media

Television

Animation

 Roy Harper / Speedy appears in the "Teen Titans" segment of The Superman/Aquaman Hour of Adventure, voiced by Pat Harrington, Jr.
 Roy Harper / Speedy appears in Teen Titans, voiced by Mike Erwin. Following a minor appearance in the episode "Winner Take All", in which he displays a serious, businesslike attitude, he goes on to join the Teen Titans' sister group Titans East in their self-titled two-part episode, displaying his traditional "bad boy" personality.
 Roy Harper / Speedy appears in the Justice League Unlimited episode "Patriot Act", voiced again by Mike Erwin. This version is Green Arrow's "ex-sidekick" and a member of the Justice League.
 Roy Harper / Speedy appears in Batman: The Brave and the Bold, voiced primarily by Jason Marsden and by Ryan Ochoa in flashbacks. This version is portrayed as a stereotypical kid sidekick and commonly uses phrases like "Golly!" or "Holy [insert uncommon phrase]".
 Roy Harper appears in Young Justice, voiced by Crispin Freeman. Initially starting as Speedy, this version was captured by the Light, who amputated his right arm to make two clones of him and control them through a combination of programming and hypnosis to serve their needs. One clone would become Jim Harper / Guardian, who serves as security for Project Cadmus and operates as a superhero under the belief that he is Roy Harper's uncle, while the second was made to believe he was the real Roy Harper and serve as a sleeper agent inside the Justice League. After becoming Red Arrow, eventually succeeding in joining the League, and learning of his true nature, the second Roy married Cheshire and had a daughter, Lian Nguyen-Harper, all while spending the next five years searching for the real Roy, causing his health and friendships to decline. Upon finding and freeing him, the real Roy seeks revenge on Light member Lex Luthor, who gives him a bionic arm. Choosing not to pursue revenge against Luthor, Roy takes the name Arsenal and briefly joins the Team before being ousted for his recklessness and disobedience while the second Roy retires from being a superhero to focus on being a father. As of Young Justice: Outsiders, the second Roy has renamed himself Will Harper and started a company called Bowhunter Security to support his family. Additionally, the Harpers have begun seeing each other like family and developed a team dynamic.
 Roy Harper / Speedy appears in Teen Titans Go! (2013), voiced by Scott Menville.

Live-action

 Colton Haynes portrays Roy Harper in Arrow. Introduced in the season one episode "Dodger", he pickpockets Thea Queen, but they fall in love and enter an on-and-off relationship. After Oliver Queen saves his life in the episode "Salvation", Harper gains an active interest in the vigilante and begins emulating him.
 In season two, Harper has begun working alongside Oliver as a vigilante. After being captured by Brother Blood and injected with Deathstroke's Mirakuru drug, Harper gains superhuman strength and healing coupled with increased hostility and violent tendencies. He is eventually cured by Oliver and Sara Lance and becomes a full-fledged member of Team Arrow, though at the cost of his relationship with Thea.
 In season three, Harper takes the name Arsenal, though he is also briefly referred to as Red Arrow. After Ra's al Ghul exposes Oliver's identity, Harper takes the fall for his mentor and allows himself to be captured in Oliver's suit, making the public believe that he had been the Arrow, before Team Arrow helps Harper out of jail and Star City by faking his death. Eventually, Thea locates Harper living under an alias. He encourages her to live the life he and Oliver sacrificed so much for, and leaves her his suit before pursuing a new life in Hub City.
 Following a minor appearance in season four, Harper is captured by Ricardo Diaz and brought back to Star City in season six to make him testify that Oliver is the Green Arrow in court, though Harper is eventually saved by Oliver and Thea. Harper helps Team Arrow battle the Thanatos Guild before joining Thea and Nyssa al Ghul in their mission to locate and destroy Lazarus Pits around the world while Oliver clears Harper's name by publicly exposing his secret identities.
 In season seven, Team Arrow recruits Harper to help them battle the Ninth Circle. Along the way, he reveals he died fighting the Thanatos Guild and was revived by Thea and Nyssa via a Lazarus Pit, resulting in him occasionally suffering from uncontrollable fits of rage. In flashforwards set in 2040, he lives in exile on Lian Yu until he is contacted by Oliver's son William. They return to Star City while following clues left behind by Felicity Smoak and link up with the Canary Network to save the city from Galaxy One.
 In season eight, having seen his future, Team Arrow recruit Harper to help them avert it. Realizing the cure to his bloodlust is being part of a team, Harper returns to Team Arrow, though he loses an arm and receives a mechanical prosthetic in the process. In the series finale "Fadeout", Harper becomes engaged to Thea.
 Roy Harper / Speedy appears in a photograph depicted in Stargirl. This version is a member of the Seven Soldiers of Victory.

Film
 Roy Harper / Speedy appears in films set in the DC Animated Movie Universe (DCAMU). This version is a member of the Teen Titans:
 Harper first appears in Teen Titans: The Judas Contract, voiced again by Crispin Freeman.
 Harper makes a non-speaking appearance in Justice League Dark: Apokolips War, in which he joins Earth's heroes in confronting Darkseid, only to be killed in battle.
 Two incarnations of Roy Harper make cameo appearances in Teen Titans Go! To the Movies.

Video games
 Roy Harper / Red Arrow makes a cameo appearance in Green Arrow's ending in Injustice: Gods Among Us.
 The Arrow incarnation of Roy Harper appears as a playable character in Lego Batman 3: Beyond Gotham via downloadable content.
 Roy Harper / Arsenal appears as a playable character in Lego DC Super-Villains, voiced again by Crispin Freeman.

Miscellaneous
 The Justice League Unlimited incarnation of Roy Harper / Speedy appears in issue #30 of Justice League Adventures.
 The Teen Titans animated series incarnation of Roy Harper / Speedy appears in Teen Titans Go! (2004). Additionally, an evil, alternate reality version of Harper as Arsenal appears in issue #48 as a member of the Teen Tyrants.
 The Teen Titans Go! (2013) incarnation of Roy Harper / Speedy appears in the Teen Titans Go! To Camp tie-in comic book series.
 The Arrow incarnation of Roy Harper / Arsenal appears in the non-canonical tie-in comic Arrow: Season 2.5.
 Roy Harper appears in Smallville Season 11 as a member of the Outsiders.

References

External links
 DC Database Project: Roy Harper
 The World's Finest JLU Bio
 The World's Finest TT Bio

Fictional spymasters
Characters created by George Papp
Characters created by Mort Weisinger
Comics characters introduced in 1941
Clone characters in comics
DC Comics martial artists
DC Comics superheroes
DC Comics male superheroes
DC Comics child superheroes
DC Comics orphans
DC Comics sidekicks
Fictional amputees
Fictional archers
Fictional detectives
Fictional drug addicts
Fictional Navajo people
Golden Age superheroes
Green Arrow characters
Superheroes who are adopted
Teenage superheroes
Vigilante characters in comics